Events from 1944 in England

Incumbent

Events

January

February

March

April

May

June
 13 June – World War II: the first V-1 flying bomb attack on London takes place. Eight civilians are killed in the blast. The bomb earns the nickname "doodlebug".

July

August

September

October

November
22nd Laurence Olivier's film of Shakespeare's Henry V is released.

December

Births
 14 December – Denis Thwaites, English professional footballer murdered in the 2015 Sousse attacks (died 2015 in Tunisia)

Deaths

See also
1944 in Northern Ireland
1944 in Scotland
1944 in Wales

References

 
England
Years of the 20th century in England
1940s in England